The Marriage of Figaro is a 1949 East German musical film directed by Georg Wildhagen and starring Angelika Hauff, Willi Domgraf-Fassbaender and Sabine Peters. It was based on the opera The Marriage of Figaro by Wolfgang Amadeus Mozart and Lorenzo Da Ponte, which was itself based on the play The Marriage of Figaro by Pierre Beaumarchais. The film was made by DEFA, the state production company of East Germany, in their Babelsberg Studio and the nearby Babelsberg Park. It sold 5,479,427 tickets.

The production used not the original Italian but a German text. The recitatives were replaced with dialogue spoken by the actors. Except for Willi Domgraf-Fassbaender as Figaro and Mathieu Ahlersmeyer as Count Almaviva, the singing parts were supplied by opera singers. During Figaro's aria "Non più andrai" (In German: "Nun vergiss leises Flehn"), a battle scene from Veit Harlan's 1942 film The Great King is shown.

Cast
 Angelika Hauff as Susanna, sung by Erna Berger
 Willi Domgraf-Fassbaender as Figaro
 Sabine Peters as Countess Rosina, sung by Tiana Lemnitz
 Mathieu Ahlersmeyer as Count Almaviva
 Elsa Wagner as Marcellina, sung by Margarete Klose
 Victor Janson as Dr. Bartolo, sung by Eugen Fuchs
 Alfred Balthoff as Basilio, sung by Paul Schmidtmann
 Franz Weber as Don Curzio, sung by 
 Ernst Legal as Antonio, sung by Willi Sahler
 Willi Puhlmann as Cherubino, sung by Anneliese Müller
 Katharina Mayberg as Barbarina, sung by Elfriede Hingst
  as Scribe (not a role in the opera)

References

Bibliography 
 Davidson, John E. & Hake, Sabine. Framing the Fifties: Cinema in a Divided Germany. Berghahn Books, 2007.

External links 
 
 Figaros Hochzeit, 
 Figaros Hochzeit, filmportal.de

1949 films
German historical musical films
1940s historical musical films
East German films
1940s German-language films
Films directed by Georg Wildhagen
Films based on The Marriage of Figaro
Films set in Seville
Films set in the 18th century
German black-and-white films
Films shot at Babelsberg Studios
Opera films
1940s German films